Dzianis Liseichykau (Дзяніс ЛІСЕЙЧЫКАЎ) (born 4 September 1979) is a Belarusian historian and archivist.

Liseichykau completed a degree in History at Belarusian State University in 2001. He received a Ph.D. in History from the Institute of History of the National Academy of Sciences of Belarus in 2009.

He has worked at the National Historical Archives of Belarus since 2002. In 2009 he became Head of the Department of Scientific Use of Documents and Information. In 2012 he accepted appointment as Deputy Director of NHAB.

His research interests are in the history of the Uniate Church (c. 1596-1839), the history of everyday life, genealogy and ecclesiastical archives.

Links 
 Personal page of Dzianis Liseichykau // on pawet.net
 Documents on the Jewish Genealogy in the collections of the National Historical Archives of Belarus
 Belarusians from abroad come home to share experiences

1979 births
Living people
People from Hantsavichy District
21st-century Belarusian historians
Belarusian male writers
Male non-fiction writers